Studio Building may refer to:

Studio Building (Berkeley, California)
Studio Building (Boston, Massachusetts)
Studio Building (New York City)
Studio Building (Portland, Oregon)
Studio Building (Toronto)

See also
Sherwood Studio Building (New York City, 1879-1960)